is a city located in Kōchi Prefecture, Japan. , the city had an estimated population of 16,370 in 8076 households and a population density of 52 persons per km².

Geography
Aki is located in southeastern Kōchi Prefecture, facing Tosa Bay of the Pacific Ocean to the south and bordered by mountains to the north. The urban area is on the plains of the Aki River.

Neighbouring municipalities 
Kōchi Prefecture
 Kōnan
 Kami
 Yasuda
 Umaji
 Geisei
Tokushima Prefecture
Naka

Climate
Aki has a humid subtropical climate (Köppen climate classification Cfa) with hot, humid summers and cool winters. There is significant precipitation throughout the year, especially during June and July.

Demographics
Per Japanese census data, the population of Aki in 2020 is 16,243 people. Aki has been conducting censuses since 1950.

History 
As with all of Kōchi Prefecture, the area of Aki was part of ancient Tosa Province.  During the Edo period, the area was part of the holdings of Tosa Domain ruled by the Yamauchi clan from their seat at Kōchi Castle. Following the Meiji restoration, the village of Aki was established within Aki District, Kōchi with the creation of the modern municipalities system on October 1, 1889. Aki was elevated to town status on November 21, 1895. On August 1, 1954 Aki merged with the villages of Ananai (穴内村), Ioki (伊尾木村), Kawakita (川北村), Higashigawa (東川村), Hatayama (畑山村), Inokuchi (井ノ口村),Doi (土居村), and Akano (赤野村) to form the city of Aki.

Government
Aki has a mayor-council form of government with a directly elected mayor and a unicameral city council of 14 members. Aki, together with the village of Geisei, contributes one member to the Kōchi Prefectural Assembly. In terms of national politics, the city is part of Kōchi 1st district of the lower house of the Diet of Japan.

Economy
Traditionally, forestry and charcoal production were mainstays of the local economy, along with commercial fishing and agriculture. In particular, the city is of the leading eggplant and yuzu production areas in Japan.

Education
Aki has nine public elementary schools and two public middle schools operated by the city government and one public middle school and two public high schools operated by the Kōchi Prefectural Department of Education.

Transportation

Railway
Tosa Kuroshio Railway - Asa Line
  -  -  -  -  -  -

Highways 
  Kōchi-Tōbu Expressway

Local attractions

Historical sites
Iwasaki Yatarō　Residence: (founder of Mitsubishi) His childhood home is located in Aki, north of the Aki City Train station off of Route 29 in Inokuchi, Aki.
Aki Castle, A castle ruin.
Noradokei Clock (野良時計): Located in Doi, Aki along Route 213.
Samurai Residence (武家屋敷): Located in Doi, Aki.
Sugio Shrine (杉尾神社)
Ryutaro Hirota's music monuments: There are 10 music monuments, each engraved with a different song of Ryutaro's. They are located all around the city.
Kariyon Clock (カリヨン時計): Large clock monument to Ryutaro Hirota. At certain hours, the clock plays music and has mechanical dolls that come out and dance.

Sites of interest
Uchiharano Pottery Center: This pottery center sells locally made pottery and blown glass art. With an appointment, you can make your own pottery in the studio.
Aki Station Jiba-San Market (安芸市ぢばさん市場): Located within the station's main building, local produce, plants, bakery goods, Aki City omiyage, and home-made bento are brought/made fresh every day and sold cheaply.
Aki Dome: This is where the Hanshin Tigers practice in the spring (beginning in February) and play their first game of the season. It draws Hanshin Tigers fans every year from all over Japan. The Dome is located in Sakuragaoka-machi and is visible along Kokudo Route 55. One can also access the Dome by going to Kyūjōmae Station (球場前駅).
Aki City Calligraphy Museum (安芸市書道美術館): Located in Doi-chō, Aki City along Route 29 next to the History Museum. The museum is a two floor establishment that displays and hosts many different calligraphy exhibitions and contests.
Aki City History Museum (安芸市歴史民俗資料館): Located in Doi-chō, Aki City along Route 29 next to the Calligraphy Museum. The museum contains information on the evolution of Aki City through history, as well as an extensive history of Iwasaki Yatarou.
Aki Fishing Port (安芸漁港)
Kikusui Sake Brewing Company (菊水酒造株式会社): Located in Hon-machi, Aki City, is a local sake brewery well known around Shikoku and the second largest producer of sake in Kochi Prefecture. The company constantly comes up with new and innovative products and is sold widely around the prefecture. Along with their constantly updating product list, they are well known for their "Shimantogawa" (四万十川) sake.
Arimitsu Brewing Company: A very small sake brewery located in Akano-chō, Aki City (along the border of Geisei Village) that produces sake using traditional methods. Production is minimal and sales are limited to Aki City and select retail stores around Kochi City. The most well-known sake they produce is called "Aki Tora" (安芸虎), which is not named after the Hanshin Tigers but instead, after Kunitora Aki who resided in the Aki Castle.
Nasu Park and Uchiharano Park: Located in Uchiharano-Chō, Aki City. Nasu park is known for the playground equipment shaped like vegetables (among which is eggplant). Uchiharano park is a large public park with a man-made lake. In the spring and summer, it is a good place to go for flower viewing while picnicking. Boats may be rented for a row around the lake.
Doyo Washroom: The Doyo Washroom is located next to the Aki City Office and is a bathroom known for playing the famous nursery rhymes that were created in Aki City.

Culture
Aki City is an agricultural city where many farmers reside and thus, is well known for its locally grown eggplant (なす), dekopon, yuzu, and tobacco. It is also well known for a dish called chirimendon (ちりめん丼), a bowl of rice covered in tiny sardines, green onions, and tsuyu sauce.

Every August, Aki City holds a Yosakoi (よさこい) festival and parade in the city. Since Yosakoi dance originated in Kōchi Prefecture, many cities around the prefecture hold smaller-scale festivals in relation to the main three-day Yosakoi festival in Kōchi, which draws groups of performers from all over Japan. Aki City's festival is one of the larger festivals held on the east side of Kochi Prefecture, and takes place over two weekends in August. Various groups from around the city, nearby cities, as well as groups from Tokushima Prefecture and Ehime Prefecture come and perform in the Aki City Yosakoi festival in preparation for the three-day festival in Kōchi.

Another well-known festival held in Aki City is the Aki City Candle-Light Festival and Illumination Event. This event takes place over two days and is held around the mid-end of December. The festivities take place in front of the Aki City train station where local music groups, junior high school bands, and high school bands perform while various local restaurants set-up stalls to sell food, drinks, and other local products. The event takes place around the birthday of Iwasaki Yatarō and is thus included in the festivities. There is also a very large display of handmade candles set up around the station, and nearby residence often participate by setting up Christmas "illuminations" and elaborate light displays.

Since Kōchi Prefecture is well known for shodo (書道) or calligraphy, the Aki City Calligraphy Museum holds a nationwide calligraphy contest every May, and another contest for high school students every July/August. Calligraphy from all over Japan is sent in to be judged by highly regarded calligraphy teachers from the prefecture, and later displayed in a public exhibition. Along with this contest, Aki City also holds a general arts (photography, painting, drawing, sculpture, wood-work) contest every September/October in the Aki City Shuminkaikan.

Other than these larger events, Aki City is also the host to various small festivals, local music performances, art exhibitions, and events. In addition, every November, Aki City is host to the "Turtle Marathon," a marathon held for people ages 30 and over from all over Japan.

References

External links

 Aki City official website 
 Aki City Map 
 Google Maps

Cities in Kōchi Prefecture
Populated coastal places in Japan
Aki, Kōchi